Massillon Christian School is a private Christian school in Massillon, Ohio.  It is a ministry of the Massillon Baptist Temple.

About MCS 
Massillon Christian School (MCS) is a private co-ed Independent Baptist ministry emphasizing Christian character and biblical principles. Classes are available for grades Kindergarten to 12th.

History 

MCS was founded in 1973 by Dr. Bruce D. Cummons (1924-2004) and the Massillon Baptist Temple. Since the doors of Massillon Christian School have opened, they have graduated over 500 students.

Athletics 
MCS provides athletics for both young men and young women. The school's sports teams are nicknamed the Chargers. MCS is a part of the Ohio Christian Athletic Conference. The sports offered are as follows: varsity boys soccer, varsity boys basketball, varsity boys baseball, junior varsity boys basketball, junior high soccer, junior high basketball, varsity girls volleyball, junior varsity girls volleyball, junior high girls volleyball, and varsity girls basketball.

Statement of Faith 

We believe that the whole Bible from Genesis 1:1 to Revelation 22:21 is the verbally inspired and infallible Word of God. 
  
We believe that there is one, and only one, living and true God—an Infinite, Intelligent Spirit; the Maker and Supreme Ruler of Heaven and earth, who is inexpressibly glorious in holiness, and worthy of all possible honor, confidence, and love. We believe that in the unity of the Godhead there are three Persons—the Father, the Son, and the Holy Spirit—equal in every Divine perfection, and executing distinct but harmonious offices in the great work of redemption. 
  
We believe Jesus Christ was born of Mary, the Virgin, and is the Son of God and God the Son. 
  
We believe that Jesus Christ died for our sins according to the Scripture, the Just for the unjust that He might bring us to God, that men are justified by faith alone. 
  
We believe that Jesus Christ rose from the grave on the third day according to the Scriptures. 
  
We believe that He, only, is the great High Priest, and we need not the intercession of any man, but that Christ ever liveth to make intercession for us. 
  
We believe that Jesus Christ will come again in Person, bodily and visibly, to establish His kingdom on the earth. 
  
We believe that in order to be saved, the soul must be born again: “Ye must be born again.” (John 3:7). Salvation is by grace and the only conditions are repentance and faith. 
  
We believe that there is eternal life only through Jesus Christ and that without Christ, there is everlasting punishment of the lost.

External links
 Official Website

Christian schools in Ohio
High schools in Stark County, Ohio
Private high schools in Ohio
Private middle schools in Ohio
Private elementary schools in Ohio
Buildings and structures in Massillon, Ohio